Fenualoa is the second largest island in the Reef Islands, administratively located in the Solomon Islands province of Temotu.

Geography
The estimated terrain elevation above sea level is some 17 metres. At low tide, Fenualoa is connected to the neighboring island of Nifiloli to the north. The west side of the island is mainly sandy beaches facing the huge lagoon and the Great Reef. The east side is steep rocky cliffs with the deep Forest Passage separating Fenualoa from the largest island of the group Lomlom.

Population
The island is very densely populated with four main villages, each made up of sub-villages and total approximately 1500 inhabitants (2008), all on the west side of the 8 km by 600m long and thin island.  The largest villages are Tuo (Tuwo), Maluba, Tanga and Malapu (running south to north).  There are three schools on the island and the people are Melanesian. A few yachts (1 or 2 per year) visit the island by entering the huge lagoon through the Great Reef (the lagoon is approximately 25 km east west by 8 km north south). There is no scheduled transport to the island.

Gallery

References

External links
 Fenualoa on Solomonislands.com.sb
 Fenualoa Island Bird Checklist 

Islands of the Solomon Islands